This article is about the particular significance of the year 1915 to Wales and its people.

Incumbents

Archdruid of the National Eisteddfod of Wales – Dyfed
Lord Lieutenant of Anglesey – Sir Richard Henry Williams-Bulkeley, 12th Baronet  
Lord Lieutenant of Brecknockshire – Joseph Bailey, 2nd Baron Glanusk
Lord Lieutenant of Caernarvonshire – John Ernest Greaves
Lord Lieutenant of Cardiganshire – Herbert Davies-Evans
Lord Lieutenant of Carmarthenshire – John William Gwynne Hughes 
Lord Lieutenant of Denbighshire – William Cornwallis-West    
Lord Lieutenant of Flintshire – William Glynne Charles Gladstone (until 13 April); Henry Gladstone, later Baron Gladstone (from 23 June)
Lord Lieutenant of Glamorgan – Robert Windsor-Clive, 1st Earl of Plymouth
Lord Lieutenant of Merionethshire – Sir Osmond Williams, 1st Baronet
Lord Lieutenant of Monmouthshire – Ivor Herbert, 1st Baron Treowen
Lord Lieutenant of Montgomeryshire – Sir Herbert Williams-Wynn, 7th Baronet 
Lord Lieutenant of Pembrokeshire – John Philipps, 1st Viscount St Davids 
Lord Lieutenant of Radnorshire – Powlett Milbank
Bishop of Bangor – Watkin Williams 
Bishop of Llandaff – Joshua Pritchard Hughes
Bishop of St Asaph – A. G. Edwards (later Archbishop of Wales) 
Bishop of St Davids – John Owen

Events
January - A memorial to Captain Robert Falcon Scott, in the form of a model lighthouse, is erected on an island in Roath Park Lake, commemorating the support given to Scott's expedition by the people of Cardiff.
26 February - The Welsh Guards regiment is created.
4 April - Three German prisoners-of-war escape from an internment camp at Llansannan in Denbighshire, but are quickly recaptured.
23 April - The body of Will Gladstone, recently killed at the Western Front, is re-buried in the churchyard of St Deiniol's, Hawarden, Flintshire, Wales. With special permission from King George V of the United Kingdom, he becomes the last casualty to be officially repatriated to the United Kingdom during the First World War.
25 April - At Gallipoli, Able Seaman William Charles Williams of Chepstow helps secure lighters on HMS River Clyde under continuous fire. He is posthumously awarded the Victoria Cross - the first such award made to a member of the Royal Navy in World War I.
7 May - When  is sunk by a German torpedo, notable survivors include David Alfred Thomas, Viscount Rhondda and tenor Gwynn Parry Jones.
26 July - The Glamorganshire Canal closes between Abercynon and Pontypridd.
11 September - The first branch of the Women's Institute in Britain opens at Llanfair PG, Anglesey.
1 October - For his conduct at the Battle of Hooge, Lt. Rupert Price Hallowes of Port Talbot is posthumously awarded the Victoria Cross.
November - The 38th (Welsh) Division is posted to France.
15 November - Sir James Cory, 1st Baronet, becomes MP for Cardiff, following the death in action of the previous incumbent, Lord Ninian Crichton-Stuart.
25 November - In the Merthyr Tydfil by-election, caused by the death of Keir Hardie, Charles Stanton becomes Independent Labour Party MP for Merthyr.
4 December - First submarine to be launched at Pembroke Dock, .
Welshmen continue to enlist for military service in World War I, including architect Percy Thomas, who joins the Artists' Rifles.
Sir William Rice Edwards becomes surgeon-general of Bengal.

Arts and literature
August - Clough Williams-Ellis marries Amabel Strachey.
unknown date - Gomer Berry and William Ewart Berry become owners of The Sunday Times.

Awards

National Eisteddfod of Wales (held in Bangor)
National Eisteddfod of Wales: Chair - T. H. Parry-Williams, "Eryri"
National Eisteddfod of Wales: Crown - T. H. Parry-Williams

New books

English language
Caradoc Evans - My People: Stories of the Peasantry of West Wales
John Gwenogvryn Evans (ed.) - Poems from the Book of Taliesin, amended and translated
Arthur Machen - The Great Return
John Cowper Powys - Wood and Stone

Welsh language
William Evans (Wil Ifan) - Dros y Nyth
Eluned Morgan - Plant yr Haul

Music
David Roberts - Y Tant Aur (2nd edition)
William Penfro Rowlands - "Blaenwern" (hymn tune),  in Henry H. Jones' Cân a Moliant

Film
The Birth of a Nation directed by Welsh-descended D. W. Griffith.

Sport
Boxing - Llew Edwards wins the British and Commonwealth featherweight titles.

Births
16 January - David Michael Davies, 2nd Baron Davies (died 1944)
11 February - Mervyn Levy, artist (died 1996)
20 February - Mary Jones, actor (died 1990)
25 March - Dorothy Squires, singer (died 1998)
2 April - Patrick Gibbs, RAF Wing Commander, author and film critic (died 2008)
9 April - Bill Clement, Welsh international rugby player and Secretary of the WRU (died 2007)
13 May - Hrothgar John Habakkuk, economic historian (died 2002)
4 June - David Bell, writer and curator (died 1959)
1 July - Alun Lewis, poet (died on active service 1944)
3 July - Ifor Owen, illustrator (died 2007)
30 August - Lillian May Davies, later Princess Lilian, Duchess of Halland, fashion model and Swedish princess (died 2013)
4 September - Roland Mathias, poet and critic (died 2007)
10 September - Geraint Bowen, poet and Archdruid (died 2011)
22 September - Thomas Williams, politician (died 1986)
23 September - John Samuel Rowlands, GC (died 2006)
11 October - T. Llew Jones, writer (died 2009)
10 November - Leslie Manfield, Wales international rugby union player (died 2006)
26 December - Keidrych Rhys, poet and journalist (died 1987)

Deaths
6 January - Owen Roberts, educator, 79
24 January - Charles Taylor, naval officer and Wales rugby international, 51 (killed in action)
30 January - Thomas Benbow Phillips, pioneer settler, 85
5 March - George "Honey Boy" Evans, musician and entertainer, 44 (cancer)
21 March - Edward Pegge, Wales international rugby player, 50
13 April - William Glynne Charles Gladstone, Lord Lieutenant of Flintshire, 29 
25 April - William Charles Williams, posthumous Victoria Cross recipient, 34 (killed in action)
6 June - John Lloyd, political reformer, 81 
31 July - Billy Geen, soldier and Wales international rugby union player, 24 (killed in action)
4 September - David Gwynne-Vaughan, botanist, 44
7 September - Robert Lewis-Lloyd, rower and barrister, High Sheriff of Radnorshire, 79 
26 September - Keir Hardie, Scottish-born serving MP for Merthyr Tydfil (Labour) and pacifist, 59 (died in Scotland)
27 September - Richard Garnons Williams, soldier and Wales international rugby union player, 59 (killed in action)
30 September - Rupert Price Hallowes, posthumous Victoria Cross recipient, 34 (killed in action)
2 October - Lord Ninian Crichton-Stuart, Scottish-born British Army officer and serving MP for Cardiff (Unionist), 32 (killed in action)
22 November - Llewellyn John Montfort Bebb, Principal of St David's College, Lampeter, 53
29 November - Rachel Davies (Rahel o Fôn), Baptist preacher, 69
10 December - David Jenkins, composer, 66
17 December - Sir John Rhys, philologist, 75

References

 Wales